The ISU Junior Grand Prix Final or JGP Final (titled the ISU Junior Series Final in the 1997–98 season) is the culmination of a series of junior-level competitions – the ISU Junior Grand Prix organized by the International Skating Union. Medals are awarded in men's singles, ladies' singles, pair skating, and ice dancing. Skaters earn qualifying points at each Junior Grand Prix event. At the end of the series, the six highest-placing skaters from each discipline advance to the JGP Final.

History 
The event was first held in early March 1998 in Lausanne, Switzerland, following six qualifying competitions at the start of the season. Eight skaters qualified in each singles' discipline, in addition to six pairs and six ice dancing teams. In 1998, at the inaugural competition, Timothy Goebel landed the first quadruple Salchow jump in competition.

The JGP Final was shifted to December beginning in the 1999–2000 season. The number of pairs and dance qualifiers expanded to eight in the 2000–01 season.

At the JGP Final in 2002, Miki Ando became the first lady to land a quad in competition, performing a quad Salchow. In the 2008–09 season, the JGP Final was organized together with its senior-level complement, the Grand Prix of Figure Skating Final, for the first time. Following the 2010–11 season, the International Skating Union reduced the number of qualifiers from eight to six in each discipline.

Medalists

Men

Women

Pairs

†Bazarova and Larionov were later disqualified from the competition due to a positive doping sample from Larionov.

Ice dancing

Cumulative medal count

References

 
 

Final
Figure skating records and statistics